Axel Gedaschko (born 1959) is a German politician, representative of the German Christian Democratic Union.

Gedaschko was born 1959 in Hamburg and is father of two children. He studied law at the University of Hamburg and Göttingen.

Since 2008 Gedaschko is state minister of Economic Affairs and Employment in Hamburg.

References

External links 
Gedaschko on abgeordnetenwatch.de, retrieved on 2009-07-26, 

1959 births
Living people
Christian Democratic Union of Germany politicians
Senators of Hamburg
University of Hamburg alumni